Jean Djunga Munganga (born 5 June 1990) is a Congolese footballer who plays for Tshakhuma Tsha Madzivhandila as a defender. He was released by Black Leopards in 2019 and subsequently joined Tshakhuma Tsha Madzivhandila.

References 

1990 births
Living people
Footballers from Kinshasa
Democratic Republic of the Congo footballers
Democratic Republic of the Congo international footballers
Association football defenders
Democratic Republic of the Congo expatriate footballers
Expatriate soccer players in South Africa
Democratic Republic of the Congo expatriate sportspeople in South Africa
FC Saint-Éloi Lupopo players
Black Leopards F.C. players
Tshakhuma Tsha Madzivhandila F.C. players
South African Premier Division players
National First Division players
21st-century Democratic Republic of the Congo people